Vilna Military District was a military district of the Imperial Russian Army. The district was formed in 1862 as part of Russian military reforms and was responsible for parts of modern Belarus, Latvia, Lithuania, and Poland. The district was disbanded at the beginning of the First World War in July 1914, and its headquarters were used to form another district farther to the rear.

History 
In the Russian Empire, military districts were first formed by Dmitry Milyutin in 1862–64 to replace the pre-existing Military Inspectorates. The military districts were organised to include civilian administration regions of gubernyas and uyezds. The Vilna Military District was created on 6 July 1862. The district headquarters were in Vilna (now Vilnius, Lithuania), and were formed from the headquarters of the 1st Army Corps, which it replaced. In 1864, the district opened the Vilna Junker Infantry School to prepare non-commissioned officers. 

In 1870, it had the second highest concentration of troops in the military district system after the Warsaw Military District, with 78,180 men. By 1871, the district's troops had been reduced to seven infantry divisions, a cavalry brigade, a demining brigade and four reserve battalions, an organization proposed in 1864. The district commander often simultaneously held the position of Governor-General of Vilna.

On 17 July 1914, just before the beginning of the First World War, martial law was imposed in the district. After the outbreak of the war later that month, the district headquarters became the headquarters of the new Dvinsk Military District. Combat units stationed in the district at the time became part of the new 1st Army, under the command of district commander Paul von Rennenkampf.

Area covered 

The Vilna Military District comprised the following gubernyas:
 Vilna
 Grodno
 Kovno
 Courland
 Livonia (excluding the Pernov, Fellinskiy, Valkskiy and Verrosskiy uyezds)
 Vitebsk
 Mogilev
 Minsk
 Suwałki  (excluding Shchuchinsk uyezd)

Military units 
The following units were based in the Vilna Military District upon the outbreak of the First World War in 1914:
2nd Army Corps
3rd Army Corps
4th Army Corps
20th Army Corps

Commanders 
The district was commanded by the following officers:
 Lieutenant General and Adjutant General Vladimir Nazimov (6 July 1862  1 May 1863)
 General of Infantry Mikhail Nikolaevich Muravyov (May 1863 - April 1865) 
 Adjutant General, Engineer General Konstantin Petrovich von Kaufmann (17 April 1865 - October 1866) 
 Adjutant General, Lieutenant General Eduard Trofimovich Baranov (9 October 1866 -2  March 1868) 
 Adjutant General, Lieutenant General Alexander Lvovich Potapov (28 February 1868 - July 1874) 
 Lieutenant General (Promoted to General of cavalry April 1878) Pyotr Albedinsky (22 July 1874  18 May 1880)
 General of engineers Eduard Totleben (18 May 1880  19 June 1884)
 General of infantry Alexander Nikitin (23 September 1884  11 March 1886)
 General of infantry Nikolay Ganetsky (13 March 1886  11 February 1895)
 General of infantry and Adjutant General Vitaly Trotsky (18971901)
 General of infantry Alexander Gurchin (19011902)
 General of infantry Oskar Grippenberg (10 November 1902  11 September 1904)
 General of infantry Alexander Freze (12 October 1904  19 December 1905)
 Lieutenant General (Promoted to General of infantry 1906) Konstantin Krzhivitsky (19051909)
 Lieutenant General (Promoted to General of infantry 1910) Sergei Gershelman (17 March 1909  17 November 1910, died of illness)
 Lieutenant General (Promoted to General of infantry 6 December 1910) Fyodor Martson (23 November 1910  17 January 1913)
 General of cavalry and Adjutant General Paul von Rennenkampff (20 January 1913  19 July 1914)

Commanders of the Dvinsk Military District 
 General of Infantry Alexei Evgrafovich Churin (19 July - 30 August 1914)
 Engineer-general Prince Nikolai Evseevich Tumanov (30 August 1914 - 14 September 1915)
 Infantry General Dmitry Petrovich Zuyev (16 September 1915 - 25 April 1917)

References 

Military districts of the Russian Empire
Military history of Vilnius